Parța is a commune in Timiș County, Romania. It is composed of a single village, Parța, and was part of Șag commune until 2004.

History 

Parța was first documented in 1334 as Parkas, and in 1417 the settlement of Maraz, with town (market) status, is recorded near Parța. At the conscription (census) carried out in 1717 by the Austrians, after the conquest of Banat, the settlement had 84 houses and was called Paraz.

In 1878, during the regularization of the Timiș River, traces of a Neolithic settlement on three levels were discovered here, in which pottery specific to the Vinča culture was found. The first systematic excavations of the site began in 1931 and were completed only in 1985. Over the course of five decades, the following have been discovered here: two Neolithic sanctuaries, one with monumental statues, relocated and restored in Timișoara's National Museum of Banat, another overlapping the first one from which only one altar has been preserved, household shrines or altars, about 150 houses and complexes and four dwellings with 4–5 rooms, some of which have a suspended floor or a first floor.

Demographics 

Parța had a population of 2,172 inhabitants at the 2011 census, up 24% from the 2002 census. Most inhabitants are Romanians (80.43%), larger minorities being represented by Hungarians (5.94%), Roma (4.65%), Serbs (2.03%) and Germans (1.98%). For 4.6% of the population, ethnicity is unknown. By religion, most inhabitants are Orthodox (50.18%), but there are also minorities of Greek Catholics (21.59%), Roman Catholics (8.56%), Pentecostals (8.47%), Serbian Orthodox (1.43%) and Baptists (1.15%). For 4.74% of the population, religious affiliation is unknown.

References 

Communes in Timiș County
Localities in Romanian Banat